The Bisexual is a comedy-drama television series created by Desiree Akhavan and Rowan Riley and starring Akhavan, Maxine Peake, and Brian Gleeson. The series, a co-production between British television network Channel 4 and American streaming service Hulu, debuted on 10 October 2018 in the United Kingdom and on 16 November 2018 in the United States.

Premise
Leila takes a break from her decade-long relationship with her partner Sadie and begins to explore her own bisexuality, though she struggles to come out to her friends.

Cast and characters
 Desiree Akhavan as Leila
 Maxine Peake as Sadie Smith
 Brian Gleeson as Gabe
 Saskia Chana as Deniz

Episodes

Reception
The Bisexual has an approval rating of 90 per cent on review aggregator website Rotten Tomatoes, based on 30 reviews. Heather Hogan at Autostraddle called the show "brilliant", adding that, "Akhavan's characters absolutely do not always do or say The Right Thing, but her writing is overflowing with compassion". Clarisse Loughrey at The Independent gave the show four stars out of five, opining that the show is "what British comedy needs to break through the stereotypes and move forward". Lucy Mangan of The Guardian described the show as "neither funny nor dramatic", giving it only two stars out of five.

In February 2023, TIME named The Bisexual as one of the Best TV Rom-Coms of the Streaming Era.

References

External links
 

2018 British television series debuts
2018 British television series endings
2010s British comedy-drama television series
2010s British LGBT-related television series
2010s British television miniseries
Bisexuality-related television series
Channel 4 television dramas
Hulu original programming
English-language television shows
Female bisexuality in fiction